is a Japanese professional wrestler currently working as a freelancer and is best known for her tenure with the Japanese promotions JWP Joshi Puroresu and Pure-J.

Professional wrestling career

Independent circuit (2013–present)
As a freelancer, Fujigasaki is known for competing in multiple promotions of the Japanese independent scene. At New Ice Ribbon #513, an event promoted by Ice Ribbon on November 16, 2013, she unsuccessfully faced Tsukushi Haruka in a singles match. At Gatoh Move Japan Tour #281, an event promoted by Gatoh Move Pro Wrestling on March 28, 2017, Fujigasaki picked up a win against Emi Sakura. At Sendai Girls Igarashi Shokai Halloween, an event produced by Sendai Girls' Pro Wrestling on October 22, 2017, she teamed up with Mika Shirahime in a losing effort against Hanako Nakamori and Meiko Satomura. At Oz Academy La Festa event from March 21, 2019, she teamed up with Mayumi Ozaki and Saori Anou in a losing effort against Aja Kong, Hikaru Shida and Makoto.

JWP Joshi Puroresu (2013–2017) 
Fujigasaki worked for most of her career in JWP Joshi Puroresu. She made her professional wrestling debutat JWP Pure Violence Road .15, an event promoted on August 18, 2013, where she went into a time-limit draw against Rydeen Hagane as a result of an exhibition match. She made her last appearance at JWP Fly High In The 25th Anniversary Party ~ The Thanksgiving the last event before the closure of the promotion on April 2, 2017, where she competed in a 17-woman battle royal also involving Dash Chisako, Hana Kimura, Jaguar Yokota, Command Bolshoi, Yumiko Hotta, Sachie Abe and others.

She is known for competing in the promotion's signature events such as Tag League the Best. She made her first appearance at the 2014 edition, teaming up with Sachie Abe, placing themselves in the Block B, and not scoring any points after going against the teams of Spring☆Victory (Kayoko Haruyama and Manami Katsu), Mascara Voladoras Leon and Ray, and Hanako Nakamori and Takako Inoue. One year later at the 2015 edition she teamed up with Yua Hayashi, fighting in the Block B against Orange Happies (Aoi Kizuki and Kayoko Haruyama), Voladoras L×R (Leon and Ray), and Arisa Nakajima and Hanako Nakamori, again not being able to score any points.

Pure-J (2017–2019) 
Fujigasaki sticked to Pure-J, the successor promotion of JWP. She competed at the PURE-J Debut Show ~ Dream Go! on August 11, 2017, where she fell short to Takako Inoue. At a house show promoted on March 17, 2019, Fujigasaki teamed up with Moeka Haruhi to unsuccessfully challenge Wanted (Kazuki and Rydeen Hagane) for the Daily Sports Women's Tag Team Championship.

Pro Wrestling Wave (2013–present) 
Fujigasaki is also part of Pro Wrestling Wave's roster although making only sporadic appearances. Even so, she is known for competing in the promotion's signature events such as the Catch the Wave tournament in which she competed placing herself in "Young Block Oh! Oh!" where she scored a total of two points after going against Yuka, Konami and Maruko Nagasaki. Another branch of events on which she competed is the Dual Shock Wave. At the 2016 edition, she teamed up with Hikaru Shida and fell short to Hibiscus Mii and Kaho Kobayashi in a first-round match. At the WAVE 10th Anniversary ~Never Ending Story~ on August 12, 2017, Fujigasaki competed in a battle royal won by Sumire Natsu and also involving Akane Fujita, Kaoru, Manami Toyota, Maya Yukihi, Mima Shimoda, Miyuki Takase, Natsumi Maki, Saki and others. At the WAVE Osaka Rhapsody Vol. 40 on May 19, 2018, Fujigasaki teamed up with Fairy Nihonbashi to unsuccessfully challenge nagisa Nozaki and Yuki Miyazaki for the Wave Tag Team Championship.

Championships and accomplishments
JWP Joshi Puroresu
JWP Junior Championship (1 time)
New Wave Award (2015)
Other titles
BRS Spunky Championship (1 time)
Pure-J
Princess of Pro Wrestling Championship (1 time)

References 

1997 births
Living people
Japanese female professional wrestlers
People from Chiba Prefecture
21st-century Japanese women